Roland Le Clerc (born 30 May 1963) is a former French racing cyclist. He rode in ten Grand Tours between 1987 and 1991.

Major results

1983
 3rd Duo Normand (with Bruno Cornillet)
1987
 3rd Duo Normand (with Bernard Richard)
1989
 1st Grand Prix de Cannes
 1st Route du Pays Basque, Essor Basque
 1st Stage 4 Tour de Luxembourg
 1st Trio Normand (with Philippe Bouvatier and Joël Pelier)
 2nd Tour du Haut-Var
 3rd Tour Méditerranéen
 10th Overall Vuelta Ciclista al Pais Vasco
1990
 3rd Boucles Parisiennes
1991
 1st Trofeo Comunidad Foral de Navarra
1992
 3rd Overall Herald Sun Tour
 4th Grand Prix d'Ouverture La Marseillaise
1993
 10th Overall Tour de Romandie

Grand Tour general classification results timeline

References

External links
 

1963 births
Living people
French male cyclists
Sportspeople from Saint-Brieuc
Cyclists from Brittany